Forster's Blue Polyommatus aserbeidschanus is a butterfly in the family Lycaenidae. It was described by Walter Forster in 1956. It is found in the Caucasus, Armenia and Turkey.

Life cycle

The larvae feed on Astragalus species, thus in Armenia they are found on Astragalus prilipkoanus. The flight period is from late July till mid-August.

Habitat
The species inhabits calcareous grasslands at the elevation from 2,000 to 2,500 m above sea level.

Subspecies
Polyommatus aserbeidschanus aserbeidschanus
Polyommatus aserbeidschanus firuza Carbonell, 1993 (northern Turkey)

References

Butterflies described in 1956
Polyommatus
Butterflies of Europe
Butterflies of Asia